Ohlsdorf is a quarter of Hamburg, Germany. Within the quarter, the Ohlsdorf Cemetery, the largest of Hamburg, is located. The cemetery is also considered the largest rural cemetery of the world.

Geography
Ohlsdorf is bordered to the north by Hummelsbüttel, to the east by Wellingsbüttel, Bramfeld and Steilshoop, to the south by Barmbek-Nord and to the west by Alsterdorf and Fuhlsbüttel. The Alster marks the boundaries to Hummelsbüttel and partly also to Fuhlsbüttel and Alsterdorf.

Since the area consists largely of cemetery grounds, Klein Borstel and the southern part of Fuhlsbüttel belong administratively to the Ohlsdorf quarter - including the Fuhlsbüttel prison, called Santa Fu.

Transportation
The important public transit hub of Ohlsdorf station is situated in the quarter, also Kornweg station of the Hamburg S-Bahn.

References

Quarters of Hamburg
Hamburg-Nord